Eiter is a surname. Notable people with the surname include:

Angela Eiter (born 1986), Austrian professional climber
Rob Eiter (born 1967), American Olympic wrestler
Nicolas Eiter (born 1996), German footballer